Donald Jones (born December 17, 1987) is a former American football wide receiver who played in the National Football League. He was signed by the Buffalo Bills as an undrafted free agent in 2010. He played college football at Youngstown State. He has also played for the New England Patriots.

Early life 
Jones grew up in Plainfield, New Jersey and attended Plainfield High School, where he was teammates with Eugene Monroe. He attended Lackawanna College prior to transferring to Youngstown State University, where he majored in broadcasting.

Professional career

Buffalo Bills 
Jones was signed by the Buffalo Bills as an undrafted free agent following the 2010 NFL Draft. He scored his first career touchdown in week 10 of the 2010 season against the Cincinnati Bengals.
Jones' time with the Bills came to an end as new coach Doug Marrone and GM Buddy Nix did not tender him a contract for the 2013-2014 season.

New England Patriots 
Jones  signed a three-year deal with the New England Patriots on March 15, 2013.

Jones was released by the team on July 19, 2013.

Retirement 
On August 7, 2013, Jones announced on his Twitter page that due to advancements in his kidney disease he would retire from the NFL.

Jones briefly played for the Somerset Patriots of the Atlantic League of Professional Baseball.

Broadcasting career 
In 2016, Jones signed on to be co-host of The John Murphy Show, a daily talk show on WGR radio and MSG Western New York. The show is sponsored by the Buffalo Bills. He left MSG and WGR in April 2018, hoping to find work closer to his home in New Jersey, from which he had commuted throughout his two-year tenure.

References

External links 
Buffalo Bills bio

1987 births
Living people
Plainfield High School (New Jersey) alumni
Players of American football from New Jersey
Sportspeople from Plainfield, New Jersey
American football wide receivers
Youngstown State Penguins football players
Buffalo Bills players
New England Patriots players
Lackawanna Falcons football players